Fuel gas is any one of a number of fuels that under ordinary conditions are gaseous. Most fuel gases are composed of hydrocarbons (such as methane or propane), hydrogen, carbon monoxide, or mixtures thereof. Such gases are sources energy that can be readily transmitted and distributed through pipes.

Fuel gas is contrasted with liquid fuels and from solid fuels, although some fuel gases are liquefied for storage or transport (for example, autogas). While their gaseous nature has advantages, avoiding the difficulty of transporting solid fuel and the dangers of spillage inherent in liquid fuels, it also has limitation. It is possible for a fuel gas to be undetected and cause gas explosion. For this reason, odorizers are added to most fuel gases. The most common type of fuel gas in current use is natural gas.

Types

There are two broad classes of fuel gases, based not on their chemical composition, but their source and the way they are produced: those found naturally, and those manufactured from other materials.

Manufactured fuel gas

Manufactured fuel gases are those produced by chemical transformations of solids, liquids, or other gases.  When obtained from solids, the conversion is referred to as gasification and the facility is known as a gasworks.

Manufactured fuel gases include:
 Coal gas, obtained from pyrolysis of coal
 Water gas, largely obsolete, obtained mainly from coke
 Producer gas, largely obsolete, obtained mainly from coke
 Syngas, major current technology, obtained mainly from natural gas
 Wood gas, obtained mainly from wood, once was popular and of relevance to biofuels
 Biogas, obtained from landfills
 Blast furnace gas

Well or mine extracted fuel gases

In the 20th century, natural gas, composed primarily of methane, became the dominant source of fuel gas, as instead of having to be manufactured in various processes, it could be extracted from deposits in the earth. Natural gas may be combined with hydrogen to form a mixture known as HCNG.

Additional fuel gases obtained from natural gas or petroleum:
 Propane
 Butane
 Regasified liquefied petroleum gas

Uses
One of the earliest uses was gas lighting, which enabled the widespread adoption of streetlamps and the illumination of buildings in towns. Fuel gas was also used in gas burners, in particular the Bunsen burner used in laboratory settings. It may also be used gas heaters, camping stoves, and even to power vehicles, they have high calorific value.

Currently, fuel gases, especially syngas, are used heavily for the production of ammonia for fertilizers and for the preparation of many detergents and specialty chemicals.

References

 
Industrial gases
Synthetic fuel technologies